Pimoa altioculata is a species of true spider in the family Pimoidae. It is found in the United States and Canada.

References

Pimoidae
Articles created by Qbugbot
Spiders described in 1886